Maladzyechna District (Maładziečanski rajon) is a second-level administrative subdivision (raion) of Minsk Region, Belarus. The capital of the town is Maladziečna.

Geography
Main settlements
Maladzyechna (94,282)
Radashkovichy (5,789)
Chist (5,422)

Notable residents 

 Mikola Abramchyk (1903, Syčavičy village - 1970), Belarusian politician and president of the Rada of the Belarusian Democratic Republic
 Janka Kupała (1882, Viazynka estate – 1942), Belarusian poet and writer
Symon Rak-Michajłoŭski (1885, Maksimaŭka village - 1938), Belarusian politician and member of the Rada of the Belarusian Democratic Republic
Siaržuk Vituška (1965, Čyść - 2012), prominent figure of the Belarusian independence movement in the late Soviet period, historian, columnist and writer

 Tomasz Zan (1796, Miasata village – 1855), poet and activist

References

 
Districts of Minsk Region